The 1954–55 Idaho Vandals men's basketball team represented the University of Idaho during the 1954–55 NCAA college basketball season. Members of the Pacific Coast Conference, the Vandals were led by first-year head coach Harlan Hodges and played their home games on campus at Memorial Gymnasium in Moscow, Idaho.

Hodges was hired in May 1954, after six seasons as head coach at Murray State in Kentucky.

References

External links
Sports Reference – Idaho Vandals: 1954–55 basketball season
Gem of the Mountains: 1955 University of Idaho yearbook – 1954–55 basketball season
Idaho Argonaut – student newspaper – 1955 editions

Idaho Vandals men's basketball seasons
Idaho
Idaho
Idaho